Aldo Bertuzzi (born 15 April 1961) is an Italian former racing driver. He raced in the European Formula 2 Championship

Complete European Formula Two Championship results
(key) (Races in bold indicate pole position; races in italics indicate fastest lap)

Complete International Formula 3000 results
(key) (Races in bold indicate pole position; races in italics indicate fastest lap.)

Non Championship Formula 3000 results
(key) (Races in bold indicate pole position; races in italics indicate fastest lap.)

Complete 24 Hours of Le Mans results

References

1961 births
Living people
Italian racing drivers
European Formula Two Championship drivers
International Formula 3000 drivers
24 Hours of Le Mans drivers
World Sportscar Championship drivers